Funco, Funko, or Funkos may refer to:

 Funco, the parent company of American video game retailer FuncoLand
 Funco (architecture), a style of house found in Cape Verde
 Funco Motorsports, an American off-road motorsport company
 Funko, an American toy company
 FunkOS, a real-time operating system